Mind Adventures is the debut album by British soul singer-songwriter Des'ree. It was released on 17 February 1992 on the Sony Soho Square record label, and features the UK top 20 hit, "Feel So High". The album became Des'ree's first top 40 album, peaking at number 26 on the UK Albums Chart.

The album was not released in the United States at the time. It got a belated release on 4 April 1995, after Des'ree's second album I Ain't Movin' had been released there the previous year and she was achieving success with the single "You Gotta Be". Since "Feel So High" had been included on the US edition of I Ain't Movin''', the US edition of Mind Adventures excluded it from its track list.

Singles
Three singles were released from Mind Adventures'', "Feel So High" (in both 1991 and 1992), "Mind Adventures" and "Why Should I Love You".

Track listing
Worldwide edition (US edition excludes "Feel So High")

Credits

Production
 Arranged by Michael Graves (tracks: 1, 2, 5, 6), Phil Legg (track: 7), Ashley Ingram (tracks: 4, 9)
 Executive producer – Des'ree
 Mixed by Phil Legg (tracks: 1, 2)
 Produced by Ashley Ingram (tracks: 1, 2, 5), Femi (track: 3), Phil Legg (tracks: 4, 6–10)
 Mastered by David Massey, Vlado Meller
 Engineered and mixed by Charlie Smith

Personnel
 Strings – Nick Ingram
 Bass – Fionn O'Lochlainn, Malcolm Joseph
 Drums – Ritchie Stevens, Trevor Murrell
 Drums, bass, guitar – Phil Legg
 Drums, bass, guitar, keyboards – Ashley Ingram
 Engineer – Brendan Lynch
 Executive producer, writer, backing vocals – Des'ree
 Guitar – Glenn Nightingale, Greg Lester, Ian Alleyne
 Keyboards – Pete Hinds, Pete Wingfield
 Percussion – Harry Morgan, Jeff Scantlebury
 Saxophone – Gary Barnacle
 Artwork – Me Company
 Photography – Monica Curtin

Other
Management – Casper King Management

Charts

Certifications and sales

References

1992 debut albums
Des'ree albums
Epic Records albums